Jhelum Tehsil is an administrative subdivision of Jhelum District in Punjab province, Pakistan. The tehsil is subdivided into 27 Union Councils and is headquartered at the city of Jhelum.

Union Councils 
Jhelum Tehsil is subdivided into 17 Union Councils:
 Badlot
 Boken
 Chak Khasa
 Chotala
 Darapur
 Dhanyala
 Garh Mahal
 Kala Gujran
 Khukha
 Kotla Faqir
 Madu Kalas
 Monan
 Mughalabad
 Nakka Khurd
 Nara
 Pandori
 Sanghoi
 Sohan
 Kot Bassira

Colleges and schools 

 Army Public School and College Jhelum Cantt
 Fauji Foundation Model School & College, Jhelum Cantt
 Cantonment Board CMB Model Jhelum
 Govt. Degree College, Jhelum
 Govt. College. G.T. Road, Jhelum
 Govt. College for Women, Jhelum
 Govt. College of Commerce, Bilal Town, Jhelum
 Research Girls College Kala Gujran Jhelum
 Jinnah Law College Near Kutcheri, Jhelum
 M. A. Jinnah College of Commerce & Computer Science, Jhelum
 Presentation convent high school for girls, Jhelum Cantt
 Jhelum Homeopathic Medical College, GT Road Jada, Jhelum
 SLS College of English Language and Information Technology, Jhelum 
 National Reformers School Mohallah Khansama Jhelum
 Cantt Public High School Jhelum Cantt

Notable residents 
 Muhammad Akram
 Nishan-e-Haider
 Tariq Kamal Khan, former Chief of Naval Staff Pakistan Navy
 Syed Manzoor ul Hassan Hashmi, Wing Commander Pakistan Airforce, Sitara-e-Jurrat Bar
 Chaudhry Farrukh Altaf, Ex- District Nazim Jhelum District
 Ch Fawad Hussain(Wazire Science and Technology)is also from JHELUM

References

External links 
 Jhelum District

Jhelum District
Tehsils of Jhelum District